Eucalyptus pilbarensis is a species of mallee or low shrub that is endemic  to the Pilbara region of Western Australia. It has smooth, white or greyish bark, lance-shaped to curved adult leaves, flower buds in groups of seven, white flowers and conical, barrel-shaped or cylindrical fruit.

Description
It has smooth grey, whitish or pinkish bark. Flowering occurs in July and the flowers are white.

Taxonomy and naming
Eucalyptus pilbarensis was first formally described in 1986 by Ian Brooker and Walter Edgecombe in the journal Nuytsia from material they collected in the Hamersley Range in 1983. The specific epithet (pilbarensis) refers to the Pilbara region where this species occurs.

Distribution and habitat
This mallee grows in more or less pure stands with E. ferriticola on mesa cliff faces and surrounding slopes of Mount Nameless, near Mount Brockman and near Roy Hill in the Pilbara region of Western Australia.

Conservation status
This eucalypt is classified as "not threatened" in Western Australia by the Western Australian Government Department of Parks and Wildlife.

See also
List of Eucalyptus species

References

Eucalypts of Western Australia
pilbarensis
Myrtales of Australia
Plants described in 1986
Taxa named by Ian Brooker